Amazing Grace is an Australian television drama series which premiered on the Nine Network on 3 March 2021.

The series was cancelled in September 2021.

Synopsis

The series centres on midwife Grace and her passionate colleagues at an unconventional birth centre attached to a major city hospital. A fierce advocate for her pregnant mothers-to- be, Grace's dubious work/life balance is about to get even more chaotic when  Sophia, the daughter she gave up for adoption 17 years ago, arrives unannounced and pregnant at the birth centre changes her life forever.

Production

The series was announced at Nine's annual upfronts in September 2020, Kate Jenkinson will play the titular role of Grace, along with supporting actors Sigrid Thornton, Catherine Van Davies, Alexandra Jensen and Kat Hoyos. Filming of the series began in Sydney in October 2020.

Cast

Kate Jenkinson as Grace Cresswell
Sigrid Thornton as Diane Cresswell
Alex Dimitriades as Kirk Gilbert
Alexandra Jensen as Sophia
Catherine Văn-Davies as Laney Tran
Ben O'Toole as Max Shaw
Kat Hoyos as Sasha Lorente
Luke Ford as Paul
Ben Mingay as Jim Delaney 
Morgan Griffin as Tiffany Adams
Jake Ryan as Tyrone

Episodes

References

External links 
 

2020s Australian drama television series
Nine Network original programming
2021 Australian television series debuts
2021 Australian television series endings